This is a list of the seasons played by SC Freiburg, from their entry into the Kreisliga Südwest in 1920 until the present day. The club's achievements in all major national and international competitions are listed.

Freiburg's greatest league successes are its four 2. Bundesliga titles, which came in 1993, 2003, 2009 and 2016. Since the creation of the Bundesliga in 1963, Freiburg has spent 22 seasons in this top division, with a best result of 3rd in 1995. The club also spent 22 seasons in the second tier 2. Bundesliga, and the remaining 15 seasons in the third tier Amateruliga.

Southern German football championship (1920–1933)

German football championship (1933–1963)

Bundesliga (1963–present)

References

Bundesliga official site
Bundesliga at dfb.de
Oberliga Südwest 1945-63 at rsssf.com
SC Freiburg at worldfootball.net

seasons
SC Freiburg
German football club statistics